The Jennie Project is a Disney Channel Original Movie that was released in the summer of 2001.  The film was based on the book Jennie by Douglas Preston. The movie is about a chimpanzee who knows and uses American Sign Language to communicate.

Plot
Hugo Archibald (Lance Guest) is a doctor and brings home a wide variety of exotic animal species.  The latest animal he brings home is a chimpanzee named Jennie. Dr. Archibald is not home very much, and Andrew, Dr. Archibald's son, feels he does not care about him.

His wife Lea (Sheila Kelley) does not want Jennie, and says she makes trouble, but the children take an instant liking to her. Jennie is unique in that she is learning to use and understand sign language.

Jennie becomes an important part of Archibald family and Andrew (Alex D. Linz) develops a close relationship with her. Jennie loves the things Andrew does, such as baseball and comic books.

Jennie is also there for Andrew when he and his father disagree. A doctor Pamela Prentiss (Sheryl Lee Ralph) starts training with Jennie. She does not agree with the way Jennie is being cared for and is seen as being rude to the Archibald family. She teaches Jennie sign language in a way that Jennie does not understand, but Lea finds a way she understands.

Dr. Prentiss tried to convince Hugo to admit Jennie in the science lab where she works, but Hugo declines, but when Jennie starts making trouble, such as taking all the mail from the mailman and eating the neighbors tulips, she is taken to court and admitted into a science lab.

Then they decide to return Jennie to Africa where she was found. The relationship between Jennie and Andrew eventually brings the whole family closer together.

Cast
 Alex D. Linz as Andrew Archibald
 Sheila Kelley as Lea Archibald
 Lance Guest as Hugo Archibald
 Abigail Mavity as Sarah Archibald
 Sheryl Lee Ralph as Dr. Pam Prentiss
 Joel McKinnon Miller as Frank
 Fran Bennett as Judge
 Earl Boen as Reverend Palliser
 Kenneth Kimmins as Epstein
 Janet Rotblatt as Mrs. Palliser
 Kelvin "Kane" Gully as Monkey Poacher

Production
The movie was filmed in San Diego's Balboa Park in areas resembling jungle. Other locations included the Museum of Man (where Hugo Archibald works) and the San Diego Zoo.  The chimpanzee known in the film as Jennie was actually an animal borrowed for the film from the San Diego Zoo.

External links
 

Disney Channel Original Movie films
American Sign Language films
2001 television films
2001 films
2000s English-language films
Films about apes
2000s American films